Delta—South Richmond was a federal electoral district in British Columbia, Canada, that was represented in the House of Commons of Canada from 1997 to 2004.

Geography

History 

This riding was created in 1996 from parts of Delta riding.
It was only used in the 1997 and 2000 federal elections. In 2003, it was abolished when it was redistributed between Delta—Richmond East, Newton—North Delta and Richmond ridings.

Members of Parliament

Election results

External links 
 Expenditures - 2000
 Expenditures – 1997
Riding history from the Library of Parliament

See also 

 List of Canadian federal electoral districts
 Past Canadian electoral districts

Former federal electoral districts of British Columbia